Oasis of the Zombies (originally called L'Abîme des Morts-Vivants / The Abyss of the Living Dead) is a 1982 film directed by Jesús Franco for French producer Marius Lesoeur. Two different versions of the film were made, each featuring different lead actors.

Plot 
The plot involves treasure hunters who track down a lost fortune in Nazi gold in the desert, only to discover that the treasure is still guarded by the Afrika Korps soldiers transporting it, who have become zombies.

Cast 
 Manuel Gélin as Robert Blabert
 France Lomay as Erika
 Jeff Montgomery as Ben
 Eric Saint-Just as Ronald
 Caroline Audret as Sylvie
 Henri Lambert as Colonel Kurt Meitzell (in the French-language version)
 Myriam Landson as Kurt's Wife (in the French-language version)
 Eduardo Fajardo as Colonel Kurt Meitzell (in the Spanish-language version)
 Lina Romay as Kurt's Wife (in the Spanish-language version)
 Antonio Mayans as Sheik Mohamed Al-Kafir
 Javier Maiza as Captain Blabert
 Albino Graziani as Prof. Deniken
 Jesús Franco as Zombie

Release 
The film has also been referred to over the years as El desierto de los zombies, The Grave of the Living Dead, and The Treasure of the Living Dead. It was released as Bloodsucking Nazi Zombies on U.S. video.

Franco filmed a "Spanish version" simultaneously with the French version (under the title La Tumba de los Muertos Vivientes). He replaced Henri Lambert and Myriam Landsom with his friends Lina Romay and Eduardo Fajardo for the lead roles in the Spanish language version. The Spanish version is a lost film.

Reception 
Writing in The Zombie Movie Encyclopedia, academic Peter Dendle stated the film has had a negative reception, but it "presents a simple, unhurried, and unpretending appreciation of zombies and their habitat, a fresh and provocative desert landscape."  Ian Jane of DVD Talk rated it 3/5 stars and wrote, "It's terrible, but somehow trance inducing in its own bizarre way."  Gordon Sullivan of DVD Verdict wrote, "It's really a mess of tepid Eurosleaze masquerading as a zombie flick, and it doesn't even do that well."

References

External links 
 
 
 Negative review at Something Awful

1982 films
1982 horror films
1980s French-language films
Nazi zombie films
French zombie films
Spanish zombie films
Treasure hunt films
Films directed by Jesús Franco
French multilingual films
Spanish multilingual films
1982 multilingual films
1980s French films